The Cratomorphini are a tribe of fireflies of the large subfamily Lampyrinae. The genera placed here often contain well-sized members of their family. The larvae of many species climb trees to feed on snails. This group contains a few "lightning bugs" (flashing fireflies) from North America, e.g. the genus Pyractomena. Further south in the American tropics, Aspisoma can be found.

Systematics
The group has recently been examined using molecular phylogenetics, using fairly comprehensive sampling.

Genera
 Aspisoma Laporte, 1833
 Aspisomoides Zaragoza-Caballero, 1995
 Cassidomorphus Motschulsky, 1853
 Cratomorphus Motschulsky, 1853
 Micronaspis Green, 1948
 Paracratomorphus Zaragoza-Caballero, 2013
 Pyractomena LeConte, 1845

References

Lampyridae